LGG may refer to:

Popular culture
 Lady Gaga, an American singer
Lisa Goes Gaga, a Simpsons episode containing the person above
 The Living Greyhawk Gazetteer, a Dungeons and Dragons sourcebook

Abbreviations for locations
 Lagang Toll Plaza on the Guthrie Corridor Expressway, Malaysia (official abbreviation)
 Langley Green railway station, England (station abbreviation)
 Liège Airport, Belgium (IATA abbreviation)

Science and technology
 Light-gas gun
 Lyons Groups of Galaxies, astronomical catalog
 One trademark for a form of Lactobacillus rhamnosus named after its discoverers Sherwood Gorbach and Barry Goldin
 Low Grade Glioma, i.e. Glioma classified as Low Grade according to a Grading scheme for tumours and other neoplasma

Other uses
 Lugbara language, a language of Uganda and the Democratic Republic of the Congo (ISO 639-3 code)